Michael Schulze (born 13 January 1989) is a German former professional footballer who played as a right-back.

Career 
Born in Göttingen, Schulze made his professional debut on 6 August 2011 for VfL Wolfsburg, in a Bundesliga match against 1. FC Köln.

In January 2017, Schulze joined the reserve side of Eintracht Braunschweig.

References

External links 
 
 
 

1989 births
Living people
Sportspeople from Göttingen
Footballers from Lower Saxony
German footballers
Association football defenders
Bundesliga players
2. Bundesliga players
3. Liga players
Regionalliga players
VfL Wolfsburg II players
VfL Wolfsburg players
FC Energie Cottbus players
1. FC Kaiserslautern players
Eintracht Braunschweig players
Eintracht Braunschweig II players
Sportfreunde Lotte players